S Pegasi (S Peg) is a Mira variable star in the constellation Pegasus. It varies between magnitude 7 and 13 with a period of 319.22 days. It is believed to be pulsating in the first overtone.

References

M-type giants
Mira variables
Pegasus (constellation)
Pegasi, S
220033
Emission-line stars
115242
Durchmusterung objects